Lucas Paes Souza (born 7 December 1997) is a Brazilian professional footballer who plays for Casa Pia as a goalkeeper.

Club career
Paes is a youth product of São Paulo, and in 2018 was due to transfer to Toronto FC. However, the transfer was called off as they found a genetic condition in his heart that threatened his playing career. Paes signed a professional contract with Vitória de Setúbal on 31 January 2020. Paes made his professional debut with Vitória de Setúbal in a 1-2 Primeira Liga loss to Rio Ave F.C. on 23 June 2020. On 20 November 2020 he transferred to Casa Pia where he acted as the backup goalkeeper Liga Portugal 2, and extended his contract with them in June 2022 after helping them earn promotion to the Primeira Liga.

References

External links

1997 births
Living people
People from São Bernardo do Campo
Brazilian footballers
Brazilian expatriate footballers
Association football goalkeepers
Primeira Liga players
Liga Portugal 2 players
Campeonato de Portugal (league) players
São Paulo FC players
Vitória F.C. players
Louletano D.C. players
Casa Pia A.C. players
Brazilian expatriate sportspeople in Portugal
Expatriate footballers in Brazil
Expatriate footballers in Portugal
Footballers from São Paulo (state)
21st-century Brazilian people